Donald Patrick Saleski (born November 10, 1949) is a Canadian former professional ice hockey right winger who played nine seasons in the National Hockey League (NHL) for the Philadelphia Flyers and Colorado Rockies.

Playing career
Saleski was drafted in the 6th round, 64th overall, by the Philadelphia Flyers in 1969 NHL amateur draft. He played in 543 career NHL games, scoring 128 goals and 125 assists for 253 career points. He played the bulk of his career (eight seasons, 1969–1977) with the Philadelphia Flyers, including their Stanley Cup winning teams of 1973–74 and 1974–75. He played the final two seasons of his career (1978–1979) with the Colorado Rockies.

Life after hockey
After hockey Saleski got involved with business. He worked for a couple of different business companies before starting his own company called Business Edge Development, which helps other organizations in improving and sustaining profitable growth by improving front line staff and managers.

Career statistics

Regular season and playoffs

External links
 
Don Saleski's profile at Hockey Draft Central
Bio as member of board of directors of breastcancer.org

1949 births
Living people
Canadian expatriate ice hockey players in the United States
Canadian ice hockey right wingers
Colorado Rockies (NHL) players
Fort Worth Texans players
Ice hockey people from Saskatchewan
Philadelphia Flyers draft picks
Philadelphia Flyers players
Quebec Aces (AHL) players
Regina Pats players
Richmond Robins players
Saskatoon Blades players
Sportspeople from Moose Jaw
Stanley Cup champions
Winnipeg Jets (WHL) players